The 2012–13 season is Panionios Gymnastikos Syllogos Smyrnis' 122nd season in existence and its 52nd in the top tier of the modern Greek football league system. This season marks the managerial debut of Dimitrios Eleftheropoulos.

The club's U17 and U20 squads will compete in their respective leagues.

Club information

Current squad
As of February 2013

Transfers

In

Out

Matches

Pre-season Friendlies

Super League

First round

Second round

Greek Cup

Fostiras 2-2 Panionios. Fostiras won on away goals.

Top goalscorers
8 goals
 Christos Aravidis (8 in Super League)
5 goals
 Markos Dounis (3 in Super League, 2 in Greek Cup)
 Andreas Samaris (5 in Super League)
4 goals
 Leonidas Kampantais (4 in Super League)
3 goals
 Fanouris Goundoulakis (3 in Super League)
 Dimitris Kolovos (3 in Super League)
2 goals
 Vasilis Lambropoulos (2 in Super League)
1 goal
 Kostas Mendrinos (1 in Super League)
 Efstathios Rokas (1 in Super League)
 Paraskevas Andralas (1 in Super League)
 Efthimios Kouloucheris (1 in Super League)

Panionios F.C. seasons
Panionios